Susyn M. Andrews (born 1953) is a British taxonomic horticulturist. Her research has focussed on temperate and subtropical woody plants, especially Holly and Lavender.

Life and work
Andrews went to school at Rathnew, County Wicklow, Ireland, studied at the National Botanic Garden, Glasnevin where she graduated in 1973 with a First Class Honours in Amenity Horticulture and a Silver Medal awarded by the Irish Department of Horticulture. She continued her studies at J.Timm and Co. Pflanzen-Kolle and Johann Bruns Nurseries in Germany and then at the Hillier Arboretum and Nursery. She worked as a horticultural taxonomist at the Herbarium, Kew Gardens, from 1976, initially in the Enquiry Unit, where members of the public could send in plants for identification, eventually becoming head of the Horticultural Taxonomy Unit. In 2003 she left Kew becoming a full time freelance Consultant Horticultural Taxonomist in her own practise, and teaches courses on taxonomy for gardeners.

Andrews has a long term taxonomic research project into Ilex of SE Asia and in cultivation as well as collaborating on Aquifoliaceae for Kubitzki's Families & Genera of Vascular Plants.

Andrews was co-founder in 1988 and chairman (1988-1998) of (HORTAX), the Horticultural Taxonomy Group, a member of the editorial committee of Curtis's Botanical Magazine, the senior editor of Taxonomy of Cultivated Plants (1999), is an Honorary Research Associate at Kew, and sat on the ISHS Commission for Nomenclature and Registration.

Her work on Lavender and Holly has been recognised by the Holly Society of America who awarded her the Wolf-Fenton Award (1991) and The Shiu-ying Hu Award (2004). She was awarded the Veitch Memorial Medal by the Royal Horticultural Society (2012), and the George Brown Memorial Award (2016) by the Kew Guild.

Select publications 

 Molecular phylogeny and historical biogeography of the genus Ilex L. (Aquifoliaceae). Cuenoud, P., Del Pero Martinez, M.A., Loizeau, P.-A., Spichiger, R., Andrews, S. & Manen, J.-F. (1999). Annals of Botany 85(1): 111–122.
 Taxonomy of Cultivated Plants: Third International Symposium. (1999). Andrews, S; A. Leslie; C. Alexander. Kew Publishing, London
 The mountain holly (Nemopanthus mucronatus) revisited with molecular data. Powell, M., Savolainen, V., Cuénoud, P., Manen, J.-F. & Andrews, S. (2000). Kew Bulletin 55(2): 341–147.
 9. Corchorus. In Beentje, H.J. & Smith, S.A.L. (eds) Flora of Tropical East Africa: Tiliaceae & Muntingiaceae. Andrews, S. (2001). Rotterdam: A.A. Balkema. 101–103.
 Tree of the Year: Nyssa. Andrews, S. (2001). International Dendrology Society Yearbook 2000: 120–158.
 Aquifoliaceae. In Soepadamo, E., Saw, L.G. & Chung, R.C.K. (eds). Andrews, S. (2002). The Tree Flora of Sabah & Sarawak 4: 1-27.
 Systematic relationship of weeping katsura based on nuclear ribosomal DNA sequences. Li, J., Dosmann, M., Del Tredici, P. & Andrews, S. (2002).  HortScience 37(3): 595–598.
 The Genus Lavandula. A Botanical Magazine Monograph. Upson, T.M. & Andrews, S. (2004). Kew: Royal Botanic Gardens, Kew. Pp 442.

References

Living people
1953 births
British women botanists
Botanists active in Kew Gardens
Veitch Memorial Medal recipients
British horticulturists